is a Japanese actress and model. She received the Elan d'or Award for Newcomer of the Year in 2011 for her work in Liar Game: Season 2 (2009–10), Liar Game: The Final Stage (2010), and Bloody Monday Season 2 (2010).

Filmography

Film

Television

Awards

Personal life
Kichise divorced her husband after 10 years of marriage in 2021. She has two daughters, born in 2010 (?) and 2016.

References

External links
 

Japanese actresses
Japanese female models
People from Asakura, Fukuoka
1975 births
Living people